California's 36th State Senate district is one of 40 California State Senate districts. It is currently represented by Republican Janet Nguyen of Huntington Beach.

District profile 
The district straddles the Orange-San Diego county border, encompassing much of San Diego County's North County region.

Orange County – 15.3%
 Aliso Viejo
 Laguna Hills
 Laguna Niguel
 Mission Viejo
 Rancho Santa Margarita
 San Clemente
 San Juan Capistrano

San Diego County – 15.4%
 Carlsbad
 Encinitas
 Oceanside
 Vista

Election results from statewide races

List of senators 
Due to redistricting, the 36th district has been moved around different parts of the state. The current iteration resulted from the 2011 redistricting by the California Citizens Redistricting Commission.

Election results 1994 - present

2018

2014

2010

2006

2002

1998

1994

See also 
 California State Senate
 California State Senate districts
 Districts in California

References

External links 
 District map from the California Citizens Redistricting Commission

36
Government in Orange County, California
Government of San Diego County, California
Carlsbad, California
Laguna Hills, California
Laguna Niguel, California
Mission Viejo, California
Oceanside, California
San Clemente, California
San Juan Capistrano, California